John Haydn Price is a former Welsh international lawn and indoor bowler and current bowls commentator.

Bowls career

Early life
Brought into the game by his grandparents at the age of 10, and as a schoolboy, he initially played only during the summer holidays, winning a couple of open tournaments in partnership with his father Harry. He started to take bowls seriously after earning his first Wales cap in 1979.

Price is one of the founder members of both the Professional Bowls Association and also the World Bowls Tour, and is a timeless ace on the portable rink, .

World Indoor Championships
Price is a four times World indoor champion, winning the singles in 1990. Price also made the 2005 final fifteen years after his first singles title was achieved, where he lost to Paul Foster in the final. He teamed up with Stephen Rees to lift the 1999 World Indoor Pairs, and was twice World Mixed Pairs champion when he partnered Carl Ashby in the 2005 and 2006 finals.

Commonwealth Games
He was a pairs Commonwealth Games silver medallist at the 1994 Commonwealth Games with Robert Weale. He also represented Wales at the 1990 Commonwealth Games.

National titles
He has amassed ten indoor Welsh National Titles and four indoor British Isle Titles and two Welsh National Bowls Championships outdoor titles, the triples in 1982 and the pairs in 1981, the latter with his father Harry Price when bowling for Aberavon BC. The pair were then successful in winning the corresponding British Isles Bowls Championships.

Administration & commentating
He is the Vice Chairperson of the Professional Bowls Association. He assists David Corkill in the commentary box for the BBC during the televised stages of the World Indoor Bowls Championships.

References

1960 births
Living people
Welsh male bowls players
Commonwealth Games medallists in lawn bowls
Commonwealth Games silver medallists for Wales
Indoor Bowls World Champions
British sports broadcasters
Sports commentators
Bowls players at the 1994 Commonwealth Games
Medallists at the 1994 Commonwealth Games
Medallists at the 1998 Commonwealth Games